Jules Joseph (Joseph) Descamps (25 October 1820 – 12 March 1892) was a Belgian Liberal politician. He was a member of the Belgian parliament for the constituency of Ath and served as President of the Belgian Chamber of Representatives from 22 March 1881 until 17 May 1884.

Sources
 De Paepe, Jean-Luc, Raindorf-Gérard, Christiane (ed.), Le Parlement Belge 1831-1894. Données Biographiques, Brussels, Académie Royale de Belgique, 1996, p. 228.

1820 births
1892 deaths
People from Ath
Presidents of the Chamber of Representatives (Belgium)